Paul Wilson Brand,  (17 July 1914 – 8 July 2003) was a pioneer in developing tendon transfer techniques for use in the hands of those with leprosy. He was the first physician to appreciate that leprosy is not a disease of the tissue but of the nerves: it is the loss of the sensation of pain which makes sufferers susceptible to injury and leads to tissue rotting away, especially in the extremities. Brand contributed extensively to the fields of hand surgery and hand therapy through his publications and lectures, and wrote popular autobiographical books about his childhood, his parents' missionary work, and his philosophy about the valuable properties of pain.  One of his best-known books, co-written with Philip Yancey, is Pain: The Gift Nobody Wants (1993), republished in 1997 as The Gift of Pain.

Early and personal life
He was born to missionary parents (Jesse and Evelyn "Granny" Brand) and grew up in the Kolli Hills of Tamil Nadu, India, until he was sent to the United Kingdom in 1923 for education.  In his books he gives vivid descriptions of his time as a boy in India with regular bouts of dysentery and malaria in the area known as "Kolli Malai". His father died in 1929 of blackwater fever, when Brand was 15. Brand trained in medicine at University College Hospital during the Second World War, and later gained his surgical qualifications whilst working as a casualty surgeon in the London Blitz. He met his wife, Margaret, in medical school.  She too was a surgeon. He died on 8 July 2003 at Swedish Hospital in Seattle, Washington.

Career
In 1946, he was invited to join the staff of the Christian Medical College & Hospital in Vellore, India.  After a visit to the Leprosy Sanatorium at Chingleput, a government institution that was at the time under church management, Brand was motivated to explore the reasons for the deformities developed in those with Hansen's disease.  After careful observation and research, he came to understand that most injuries in Hansen's disease patients were a result of the pain insensitivity they experienced, and not directly caused by the Hansen's disease bacilli.  In 1950, with a donation from a missionary woman, Brand established the New Life Center, Vellore, as a model rehabilitation center for Hansen's disease patients. The center was a village environment in the residential area of the Christian Medical College & Hospital campus.  This helped dispel the stigma that was so prevalent even among medical professionals.

In 1966, after 19 years of service in India, he moved to the USA on invitation to take up the position of Chief of Rehabilitation Branch at the National Hansen's Disease Center at Carville, Louisiana. He worked there for 20 years and established a well-equipped and well-staffed research unit to study the complications of insensitive hands and feet, their prevention and management. His methods for prevention and management of plantar ulcers are now extensively used for treatment of patients with diabetes mellitus who have similar problems. Brand also popularised the technique of serial casting for the finger deformities (flexion contractures) that often result from Hansen's disease, a technique that is now widely used by hand therapists to treat contractures from many different hand injuries and conditions. When he retired in 1986 from the US Public Health Service, he moved to Seattle and continued his teaching work as emeritus professor of Orthopedics in the University of Washington.

During his career, Brand received many awards and honors. He was awarded the Hunterian professorship of the Royal College of Surgeons in 1952, and the Lasker Award in 1960. Queen Elizabeth honored him with a title of the Commander of the Order of the British Empire in 1961. He served as President of The Leprosy Mission International based in London and was on the Panel of Experts on leprosy of the World Health Organization. He was one of the main architects of the All-Africa Leprosy Rehabilitation and Training Center in Addis Ababa, Ethiopia, and the Schieffelin Leprosy Research and Training Center at Karigiri, India, in the Vellore district. He was an honorary member of the American Society of Hand Therapists, in recognition of his many contributions to the field. In 1966, he accepted a post as chief of rehabilitation at the public hospital in Carville, Louisiana, the only leprosy hospital in the United States. He worked there until his retirement in 1986. From 1993 to 1999, he was the President of The Leprosy Mission International, then moving to Seattle to become the Clinical Professor of Orthopoedics, Emeritus, at the University of Washington.

A biography was written on him, Ten Fingers for God by Dorothy Clarke Wilson.

His appreciation of the importance and value of pain is well described in his 1993 book with Philip Yancey, Pain: The Gift Nobody Wants. He saw pain as vital for the preservation of healthy tissue in anyone leading a normal life and he gives horrifying descriptions of the results of insensitivity in those with Hansen's disease or congenital absence of pain.  He goes on to question the pursuit of pleasure in Western society and offers practical ways to ameliorate the effects of pain. The book contains a foreword by Surgeon General C. Everett Koop.

References

Sources
 
 
 
 
 
 

1914 births
2003 deaths
British evangelicals
British leprologists
British surgeons
Commanders of the Order of the British Empire
Christian humanists
People from Namakkal district
20th-century surgeons
British Protestant missionaries